Isaiah "Bunny" Wilson (born May 31, 1948) is a former professional basketball player who played in the National Basketball Association (NBA) and American Basketball Association (ABA). Wilson was drafted with the twelfth pick in the second round of the 1971 NBA Draft. He played in 48 games for the Detroit Pistons in the 1971-72 NBA season and averaged 3.5 points per game, 0.9 assists per game and 1.0 rebound per game. He also played one season in the ABA for the Memphis Tams and averaged 6.3 points per game, 2.4 assists per game and 1.3 rebounds per game.

References

1948 births
Living people
Allentown Jets players
American men's basketball players
Baltimore Bees men's basketball players
Basketball players from Philadelphia
Detroit Pistons players
Detroit Pistons draft picks
Memphis Tams players
Shooting guards